The G-class destroyers were a proposed class of eight destroyers of the Royal Navy ordered during the Second World War under the 1944 Programme. Two were ordered (from Yarrow) on 24 July 1944, and six more on 30 August 1944, but all were cancelled on 13 December 1945, after the end of the war.

It has been referred to as the Gael class or Gallant class of destroyers.

Design
The G-class destroyers were proposed for the Royal Navy's shipbuilding programme as a follow-on to the Weapon class. Like the Weapons, the G class were meant as a smaller destroyer, capable of being built in facilities that could not manage the larger  or  ships. The major change was to replace the Weapons' main gun armament of six 4-inch guns with four 4.5 inch guns in the new Mk. VI twin mountings.

The new class used the same machinery as the Weapon class, arranged in the "unit" system, with two separate boiler rooms and engine rooms, meaning that a single hit was unlikely to cause a total loss of power.

Close in anti-aircraft armament consisted of six Bofors 40 mm guns, with two twin mounts and two single mounts. Ten 21 inch (533 mm) torpedo tubes were fitted, in two quintuple mounts.

Ships

Notes
Notes

References

References

Warships of World War II, Pt 2, HT Lenton and JJ Colledge, Ian Allan 1962?

Destroyer classes
 
Ship classes of the Royal Navy